Gegeneophis krishni, the Gurupur caecilian, is a species of caecilian found in India. It is only known from its type locality Gurupur, near Mangalore in Karnataka, India.

References

krishni
Amphibians of India
Endemic fauna of India
Fauna of Karnataka
Amphibians described in 1999